Rebecca Grace Tobin (born January 18, 1986) is an American actress, singer, and dancer. She is known for her role as Kitty Wilde on the Fox musical comedy-drama series Glee.

Early life
Tobin grew up in Marietta, Georgia, the younger of two daughters. Both of her parents were attorneys. Her father is Jewish. Tobin's first acting performance was at age four, when she played a Christmas tree in her school's holiday pageant. For high school, Tobin was predominantly educated at Pebblebrook High School, but she transferred to Joseph Wheeler High School halfway through her senior year and was a victim of bullying as a result. Because of the bullying, Tobin did not walk at her graduation. She is an alumna of the American Musical and Dramatic Academy in New York City, from which she graduated in 2007.

Career
Tobin began her professional career on the stage in Houston, Texas, in a Theatre Under the Stars production of the musical Cats. She performed as Etcetera in the ensemble cast. The following year, she starred in the ensemble of the Theater Under the Stars' production of West Side Story, also in Houston. In 2008, Tobin performed in the ensemble of Paper Mill Playhouse's production of High School Musical on Stage! in New Jersey. From 2008 to 2009, she performed in the ensemble of Oklahoma! in Atlanta with the Theater of the Stars company. Tobin made her Broadway debut as a replacement for the role of Sherrie Christian and a swing for the musical Rock of Ages. In 2011, she toured with the Trans-Siberian Orchestra.

From 2012 until its ending in 2015, Tobin portrayed cheerleader and glee club member Kitty Wilde in the Fox musical comedy-drama television series Glee. She made her first appearance as the character in the fourth season premiere episode "The New Rachel", and was a regular recurring cast member for throughout that season. She was upgraded to a main cast member for the series' fifth season. Kitty's debut received a mixed reception from critics, but opinions on the character soon changed. Several songs performed by Tobin as Kitty on the series have been released as singles available for digital download, and have also featured on the soundtrack albums.

In 2014, Tobin guest starred in Lifetime's legal comedy-drama series Drop Dead Diva as Empress Katia in the episode "Afterlife". That same year, she appeared as Kimmee Kittson in the episode "Passing the Torch" of ABC Family's sitcom Mystery Girls. In 2015, Tobin guest starred as Blaze Talcott, a computer coder, in an episode of CBS' procedural action-drama series NCIS: Los Angeles titled "Blaze of Glory". Since December 2015, Tobin has co-hosted the female-centric podcast series "The Lady Gang" with Keltie Knight and Jac Vanek. In October 2018, Ladygang premiered as a talk show on the E! network.

Personal life
Tobin was in a relationship with nightclub entrepreneur Matt Bendik until his death on July 10, 2014. She became engaged to entrepreneur Zach Martin in May 2016. They married in a private ceremony, officiated by Tobin's Glee co-star Jane Lynch, in Jackson Hole, Wyoming on December 3, 2016.

In May 2013, she appeared in an issue of Maxim.

On February 22, 2022, Tobin announced on Instagram that she and her husband welcomed a son via surrogacy. Tobin and Martin were open about their fertility struggles and IVF journey prior to the arrival of their son.

Filmography

Stage

Discography

Awards and nominations

References

External links

 
 

1986 births
21st-century American actresses
Actresses from Georgia (U.S. state)
American female dancers
Dancers from Georgia (U.S. state)
American women singers
American Musical and Dramatic Academy alumni
American musical theatre actresses
American women podcasters
American podcasters
American stage actresses
American television actresses
Living people
People from Marietta, Georgia